TaiwanMoney Card  is a contactless Smart card in use in seven cities centred on the southern Taiwanese city of Kaohsiung.
It is a combined credit card, electronic purse and public transport payment card being the first such card when it was rolled out by its providers (MasterCard, Cathay United Bank and Acer e-Service) in June 2006.

History
The Kaohsiung City transit authority selected a consortium led by Acer to run the program in 2003, testing began in 2005 before roll out in 2006.

Technology
The technology used is based on the Mondex system.

Network

The TaiwanMoney card is widely accepted including the following:

Kaohsiung bus Management Service
Kaohsiung City shipping company
South East Bus Company (Operating 7 routes under contract to Kaohsiung City Buses)
Kaohsiung Bus (including Tainan City Buses)
Kuo-Kuang Motor Transport Company Ltd (Southern Highway Passenger Line)

See also
List of smart cards
Octopus card
OnePulse

References

External links
Official website (Chinese)
http://www.banktech.com/news/showArticle.jhtml?articleID=159904091
http://www.cardtechnology.com/article.html?id=20060317366M1LIB
http://www.cardsinternational.com/get.asp?*script=article&ID=24666&search=TaiwanMoney%20Card&site=1
http://www.multos.com/downloads/marketing/CaseStudy_Taiwan_Money.pdf
http://echeckcasinos.ca

Contactless smart cards
Fare collection systems in Taiwan
Credit cards
Kaohsiung